Tight five may refer to:

The five non-loose forwards in a rugby union scrum
The Tight Five, a group of Māori New Zealand Parliament members first elected in 1996
Bach Tight Five, a musical project of heavy metal singer Sebastian Bach
A five-minute stand-up comedy routine